The James A. Fulmer House is a historic house at 303 North Main Street in Fountain Inn, South Carolina.  It is a  story brick building, with a side gable roof and projecting gable section on the left front.  It is basically Tudor Revival in character, but also exhibits Craftsman details such as extended eaves and exposed rafter ends.  Built in 1932 for a prominent businessman, it is one of the city's finest examples of Tudor Revival architecture, and a rare example of design work by Leila Ross Wilburn, one of the first female pattern-book architects.

The house was listed on the National Register of Historic Places in 2015.

See also
National Register of Historic Places listings in Greenville County, South Carolina

References

Houses on the National Register of Historic Places in South Carolina
Tudor Revival architecture in South Carolina
Houses completed in 1932
Houses in Greenville County, South Carolina
National Register of Historic Places in Greenville County, South Carolina